Elizabeth Mary Lydia "Lizzy" Banks (née Stedman; born 7 November 1990) is an English professional racing cyclist, who rides for UCI Women's Continental Team  in 2022. Banks took up cycle racing in 2015 after participating in bicycle touring and cycling to clinical placements as a medical student. She left her medical studies shortly before she was due to graduate in order to pursue her cycling career.

Major results

2018
 9th Chrono Gatineau
2019
 1st Stage 8 Giro Rosa
 2nd SwissEver GP Cham-Hagendorn
 3rd Overall Grand Prix Elsy Jacobs
 5th Overall Giro delle Marche in Rosa
 7th Overall The Women's Tour
 9th Overall Women's Tour de Yorkshire
2020
 1st Stage 4 Giro Rosa
 2nd GP de Plouay
 6th Omloop Het Nieuwsblad

References

External links
 

1990 births
Living people
English female cyclists
People from Malvern, Worcestershire
Sportspeople from Worcestershire